The Kyusyu Open is a professional golf tournament that is held on Japan's southern island, Kyushu. It was first played in 1971 and was a Japan Golf Tour event from 1973 until 1991.

Winners

References

External links
Coverage on Japan Golf Tour's official site
Golf Union Kyushu Home Page 

Golf tournaments in Japan
Former Japan Golf Tour events
Recurring sporting events established in 1971